SMPS may refer to:

 Scanning mobility particle sizer, an analytical instrument for aerosol particles
 Switched-mode power supply, an electronic power supply